Nihat Alptuğ Altınkaya (born 28 September 1979) is a Turkish actor, model and sportsman. He is also the winner of the 2012 season of Survivor: Ünlüler vs. Gönüllüler.

Personal life 
Nihat Altınkaya was born on 28 September 1979 in Karabük. Born to a family that originates from Rize, he finished high school in Karabük. He has two sisters. His mother was a bank clerk, while his father run a business. He played in the volleyball teams of Karabük Demir Çelik High School and Ankara Emlak Bank Sport Club. After suffering from an injury at the age of 17, he stopped playing volleyball and began working as a bodyguard at a nightclub in Ayvalık. Later, he moved to Istanbul and after getting trained in boxing he joined the boxing department of Fenerbahçe S.K. He eventually began modeling and started appearing in TV series. He briefly dated his costar from Yaprak Dökümü Deniz Çakır. In December 2010, he married İmre Altınkaya. Together they have two daughters, named Melek and Ayşe. They reside in Istanbul.

Career 
He was first discovered by Gökçe Doruk Erten, after which he played in Funda Arar's music video "Özledim". He then continued his career as a model. Altınkaya eventually started his career as an actor and appeared in the Turkish-Belgian movie Turkuaz as well as two other films. At the same time, he got recurring roles in various TV series. He also received theatre lessons at "Ekol Drama Art House" from Ayla Algan and İpek Bilgin. He later shared the leading role with Ezgi Asaroğlu in Kağan Erturan's first feature film En Mutlu Olduğum Yer.

Filmography

References

External links 
 
 

Turkish male television actors
Turkish male models
Turkish male film actors
Turkish men's volleyball players
1979 births
Living people
People from Karabük Province